The Vane, later Vane-Tempest Baronetcy, of Long Newton in the County of Durham, was a title in the Baronetage of Great Britain. The Vane baronetcy was created on 13 July 1782 for Reverend Henry Vane, D.D., second son of George Vane of Long Newton. He was a descendant of Sir Henry Vane the Elder. Vane married Frances Tempest, daughter of John Tempest of Sherburne, Durham.  When her brother, John Tempest, died in 1771 naming the baronet's son as his heir, the younger Vane assumed by Royal licence the additional surname of Tempest in accordance with his uncle's will. Thus, when the 1st baronet died in 1794, his son became Baronet Vane-Tempest. This second baronet represented both the city and county of Durham in Parliament and was a well-known sportsman. He married Anne MacDonnell, 2nd Countess of Antrim. They had one child Lady Frances Anne, who married Lord Charles Stewart, later 3rd Marquess of Londonderry, who assumed the surname of Vane and in 1823 was named Earl Vane and Viscount Seaham. When Vane-Tempest died in 1813, the baronetcy became extinct.

Vane, later Vane-Tempest baronets, of Long Newton (1782)
Sir Henry Vane, 1st Baronet (–1794)
Sir Henry Vane-Tempest, 2nd Baronet (died 1813)

See also
Baron Barnard
Marquess of Londonderry
Earl of Antrim

References

Sources
Cokayne, George E., Complete Baronetage, Exeter:William Pollard & Sons, 1906, vol. 5, p. 224.

Extinct baronetcies in the Baronetage of Great Britain